Zoheyri may refer to:
 Zoheyri-ye Olya
 Zoheyri-ye Sofla